Iman Zakizadeh (born 8 June 1996) is an Iranian footballer who plays as a center forward for Gol Reyhan Alborz in the Azadegan League.

He made his Iran Pro League debut on 23 February 2018 against Siah Jamegan.

Club career statistics 

Last Update: 4 March 2018

References

Sepahan S.C. footballers
1996 births
Living people
Iranian footballers
Association football forwards
Sportspeople from Isfahan